Chrysoprasis aeneicollis is a species of beetle in the family Cerambycidae. It was described by Buquet in 1844.

References

Chrysoprasis
Beetles described in 1844